Lola Lane (born Dorothy Mullican; May 21, 1906 – June 22, 1981) was an American actress and one of the Lane Sisters with her sisters Leota, Rosemary, and Priscilla Lane. She appeared on Broadway and in films from the 1920s to 1940s.

Early years
The daughter of a dentist, Lane was born in Macy, Indiana, and grew up in Indianola, Iowa. As a teenager, she played piano for silent films and sang in a flower shop. Vaudeville entertainer Gus Edwards discovered her and put her on the road to her professional career. Lane and her sister Leota graduated from a conservatory at Simpson College and were performing in New York by 1926. Edwards had discovered them performing in a benefit concert in Des Moines, Iowa.

Career

Edwards changed the actress's name and added her to his touring production, Ritz Carlton Nights. In 1926, she and her sister Leota appeared in the Greenwich Village Follies in New York City. She went on to appear in vaudeville shows on the Orpheum, Loew, and Interstate circuits and later acted on Broadway in The War Song (1928), leading to her work in films when a talent scout saw her. After a screen test, she made her film debut in Speakeasy (1929).

Most of Lane's films were Warner Bros. productions. They included Four Daughters, Four Wives, and Four Mothers, in each of which she appeared with her sisters Priscilla and Rosemary. She also appeared in the Warner Bros. classic Marked Woman (1937) with Bette Davis and Humphrey Bogart.

Personal life
On September 11, 1931, Lane married actor Lew Ayres in Las Vegas, Nevada. They remained wed until 1933. She was also married to Henry Dunham, a yacht broker, and director Roland West. When he died, she was married to Robert Hanlon, a retired aircraft executive.

As Democrats, Lane and her sisters supported the campaign of Adlai Stevenson in the 1952 presidential election. She converted to Catholicism in 1961.

On March 31 1931, she may appear before Municipal Judge Dudley S. Valentine to explain “how come” on speeding.  A charge was filed on Miss Lane with driving 40 miles an hour in a 15 mile zone on La Brea avenue .

Death
Lane died at her home in Santa Barbara, California, on June 22, 1981, at age 75. She was buried at Calvary Cemetery in Santa Barbara.

Recognition
Comic book writer Jerry Siegel named Lois Lane, the fictional reporter and Superman's girlfriend in DC Comics, after Lola Lane.

In 1967 Lane received a Pope Pius X medal for her efforts in religious training of mentally challenged people.

Filmography

The Girl from Havana (1929) .... Joan Anders
Fox Movietone Follies of 1929 (1929) .... Lila Beaumont
Speakeasy (1929) .... Alice Woods
The Costello Case (1930) .... Mollie
Good News (1930) .... Patricia Bingham
The Big Fight (1930) .... Shirly
Let's Go Places (1930) .... Marjorie Lorraine
Ex-Bad Boy (1931) .... Letta Lardo
Hell Bound (1931) .... Platinum Reed
Public Stenographer (1933) .... Ann McNair
The Woman Who Dared (1933) .... Kay Wilson
Burn 'Em Up Barnes (1934) .... Marjorie Temple
 Ticket to a Crime (1934) .... Peggy Cummings
Port of Lost Dreams (1934) .... Molly Deshon/Molly Clark Christensen
The Woman Condemned (1934) .... Jane Merrick
His Night Out (1935) .... Lola
Death from a Distance (1935) .... Kay Palmer
Alias Mary Dow (1935) .... Minna
Murder on a Honeymoon (1935) .... Phyllis La Font
In Paris, A.W.O.L. (1936) .... Lola
Hollywood Hotel (1937) .... Mona Marshall
The Sheik Steps Out (1937) .... Phyllis 'Flip' Murdock
Marked Woman (1937) .... Dorothy 'Gabby' Marvin
Four Daughters (1938) .... Thea Lemp
Mr. Chump (1938) .... Jane Mason
When Were You Born (1938) .... Nita Kenton√ (Cancer)
Torchy Blane in Panama (1938) .... Torchy Blane
Four Wives (1939) .... Thea Lemp Crowley
Daughters Courageous (1939) .... Linda Masters
Girls of the Road (1940) .... Elly
Gangs of Chicago (1940) .... June Whitaker
Zanzibar (1940) .... Jan Browning
Convicted Woman (1940) .... Hazel Wren
Four Mothers (1941) .... Thea Lemp Crowley
Mystery Ship (1941) .... Patricia Marshall
Lost Canyon (1942) .... Laura Clark
Miss V from Moscow (1942) .... Vera Marova, posing as Greta Hiller
Buckskin Frontier (1943) .... Rita Molyneaux
Identity Unknown (1945) .... Wanda
Steppin' in Society (1945) .... The Duchess
 Why Girls Leave Home (1945) .... Irene Mitchell
Deadline at Dawn (1946) .... Edna Bartelli
They Made Me a Killer (1946) .... Betty Ford

References

External links

1906 births
1981 deaths
20th-century American actresses
Actresses from Indiana
Actresses from Iowa
American film actresses
California Democrats
Catholics from Indiana
Converts to Roman Catholicism
Iowa Democrats
People from Indianola, Iowa
People from Miami County, Indiana